Mallory Bluff is a prominent bluff on the northwest slope of Grindley Plateau, Antarctica, just northeast of the head of Wahl Glacier. It was named by the Advisory Committee on Antarctic Names for Roger P. Mallory, Jr., a United States Antarctic Research Program meteorologist at South Pole Station, 1962, and at Wilkes Station, 1963.

References

Cliffs of the Ross Dependency
Dufek Coast